Yeshiva Ohr Elchonon Chabad West Coast Talmudical Seminary (YOEC) is a yeshiva college in Los Angeles, California. It is the largest yeshiva college on the West Coast of the United States.

The yeshiva also houses a private boys high school accredited by the Western Association of Schools and Colleges, called Yeshiva Ohr Elchonon Chabad High School.

The seminary is affiliated with the Chabad-Lubavitch Hasidic movement. The seminary's four-year Bachelor of Liberal Arts and Rabbinical Studies is accredited by the Association of Advanced Rabbinical and Talmudic Schools, recognized by the Council for Higher Education Accreditation The degree has a strong emphasis of Philosophy, Jewish Law, Talmudic analytics, Ethics, and Rabbinic literature.

Rabbi Ezra Schochet, scholar and Talmudist, has held the position of dean since the yeshiva's founding in 1977.

In 2003 the yeshiva underwent a $5 million renovation, adding  of space for dormitories, study rooms, and study hall.

See also
Yeshiva Ohr Elchonon (Jerusalem)

References

The American Jewish writer and publisher, Richard Horowitz, wrote a memoir, The Boys Yeshiva, describing his time teaching at a Chabad yeshiva in Los Angeles.

External links

Chabad in the United States
Chabad yeshivas
Orthodox yeshivas in the United States
1977 establishments in California